The Quadrangular Series in Ireland was a One Day International cricket tournament, contested between three associate nations (Ireland, Netherlands and Scotland) and one full member (the West Indies), from 10 to 15 July 2007, following the conclusion of the West Indies' tour of England. The matches were played in both Northern Ireland and the Republic of Ireland.

The tournament came three months after the World Cup which saw Ireland beat the Test nations Pakistan and Bangladesh, and tie with Zimbabwe, gaining themselves a right to be ranked on the official ICC ODI Championship. Ranked two places below the West Indies, Ireland intended to justify their place in the table. Their match against the West Indies was abandoned due to rain, but they beat the two fellow Associates Scotland and the Netherlands. Scotland was looking to return to their pre-World Cup form, having lost all three World Cup matches (including one to the Netherlands), however they ended the Ireland tournament with two losses and a rained out match. The Netherlands, with no major accolades to their name since winning the 2001 ICC Trophy suffered the same fate. The tournament was eventually won by the West Indies, thanks to a bonus point from their match against the Netherlands.

Points table

Matches

External links
Cricinfo – Series page
CricketArchive – Series page

International cricket competitions in 2007
2007 in Irish cricket